Australasia is a region that comprises Australia, New Zealand and some neighbouring islands in the Pacific Ocean. 

Australasia may also refer to:

 Australasia (album), by Pelican, 2003 
 , an American Great Lakes freighter 1884–1896

See also

 Australasian (disambiguation)